Sir Kenneth Hamilton Bailey  (3 November 18983 May 1972) was a senior Australian public servant and lawyer, best known for his time as Secretary of the Attorney-General's Department between 1946 and 1964.

Life and career
Kenneth Bailey was born on 3 November 1898 in Canterbury, Victoria. He was dux of his high school, Wesley College, in 1916. He was Victoria's Rhodes Scholar for 1918, a feat later emulated by his son. Both attended Corpus Christi College, Oxford.

In 1927, Bailey was appointed professor of jurisprudence at the University of Melbourne; the following year becoming the first Australia-born dean of the law school.

Between 1946 and 1964, Bailey was Solicitor-General of Australia and Secretary of the Attorney-General's Department. During his time as Solicitor-General, Bailey officially opened the Australian Police College in Barton on 25 October 1960.

Bailey died on 3 May 1972 in Canberra and was cremated. His son, Peter Hamilton Bailey, was also a public servant, as well as a human rights academic.

Awards and honours
Bailey was appointed a Commander of the Order of the British Empire in June 1953 whilst Permanent Head of the Attorney-General's Department. He was knighted in 1958.

In 1972, the University of Melbourne awarded Bailey an honorary doctorate at a special conferring ceremony at Canberra Hospital. The degree was conferred to recognize his distinguished service to the university.

References

1898 births
1972 deaths
Australian Commanders of the Order of the British Empire
Australian Knights Bachelor
Australian Rhodes Scholars
People educated at Wesley College (Victoria)
Solicitors-General of Australia
Alumni of Corpus Christi College, Oxford
University of Melbourne alumni
High Commissioners of Australia to Canada

20th-century Australian public servants
People from Canterbury, Victoria
Lawyers from Melbourne